The Friary School (formerly Friary Grange) is a mixed secondary school and sixth form located in Lichfield, Staffordshire, England. The school became an arts and sports college in 2006 and despite this status being withdrawn by the DofE in 2010 the subjects remain high-profile in the school and local community.

The school shares its sporting facilities, including astro-turf pitches, a sports hall, a multi-gym, and a swimming pool, with Lichfield Council for community use.

History 
With the introduction of Comprehensive secondary education in the period 1970-73 a new school opened on Eastern Avenue as Friary Grange initially taking older pupils. The former girls' grammar school at St.John Street was renamed The Friary and catered for younger pupils. The school was finally united at Eastern Avenue as The Friary in 1987. The St. John Street site became Lichfield college with the city library and records office moving to the site in 1989.

Previously a community school administered by Staffordshire County Council, in September 2019 The Friary School converted to academy status. The school is now sponsored by the Greywood Multi-Schools Trust.

Notable former pupils 
Sian Brooke, actress
Siobhan Dillon, actress and singer
John Eccleston, puppeteer, writer, television presenter and programme creator
David Charles Manners BEM, writer, theatre designer and charity co-founder
Daniel Sturridge, England and Liverpool FC footballer
Brad Foster (boxer), British Title-Winning Boxer
Levi Davis (rugby union), Rugby player

References

External links 
 

Schools in Lichfield
Secondary schools in Staffordshire
Educational institutions established in 1892
1892 establishments in England
Academies in Staffordshire